Rein Kilk (born on 8 March 1953 in Tartu) is an Estonian entrepreneur and sport figure.

From 1971 to 1985 he studied the law at the University of Tartu. Since 2012 he is studying literature and cultural science at the University of Tartu.

From 1979 to 1981, he became a three-time Estonian champion in long-distance running. In 1981 he won Viljandi Lake Running Competition .

Since 2003, he is the president of Estonian Rowing Federation. From 2004 to 2012 he was a member of Estonian Olympic Committee's executive committee.

He has been a member of the board of AS Pärnu Sadam, and AS Eesti Energia.

Awards:
 2005: Order of the White Star, IV class.

References

Living people
1953 births
Estonian businesspeople
Estonian male long-distance runners
Recipients of the Order of the White Star, 4th Class
University of Tartu alumni
Sportspeople from Tartu